Teitur Örlygsson (born 9 January 1967) is an Icelandic former professional basketball player and a coach. During his career he won the Icelandic national championships ten times with Njarðvík and the Icelandic Basketball Cup seven times. He spent the 1996–1997 season with Gymnastikos S. Larissas B.C. of the Greek Basketball League.

Icelandic national team
Between 1986 and 2000, Teitur played 118 games for the Icelandic national basketball team.

Coaching career
Teitur started his coaching career with Njarðvík nine games into the 1992–1993 season when he finished the season as a player-coach after the firing of head coach Poul Coltin. He was again a player-coach for Njarðvík, this time along with Friðrik Ragnarsson, when the team won the national championship in 2001. Four years after retiring as a player, ee returned to Njarðvík as a head coach for the 2007–2008 season but was fired after the playoffs.

In December 2008, Teitur was hired as the head coach of Stjarnan. In 2011, he led the club to the Úrvalsdeild finals and in 2009 and 2014 led the club to victory in the Icelandic Cup. He left the club after the 2013–2014 season.

Personal life
Teitur is the brother of former Icelandic national team player Sturla Örlygsson and former Althing member Gunnar Örn Örlygsson.
He is also uncle of Örlygur Aron Sturluson and Margrét Kara Sturludóttir who both played for the Icelandic national teams.

References

External links
Úrvalsdeild statistics at kki.is

1967 births
Living people
Gymnastikos S. Larissas B.C. players
Teitur Orlygsson
Teitur Orlygsson
Teitur Orlygsson
Teitur Orlygsson
Teitur Orlygsson
Small forwards
Teitur Orlygsson
Teitur Orlygsson
Teitur Orlygsson